Aminabad (also Romanized as Amīnābād) is a village in Chaharduli Rural District, in the Central District of Asadabad County, Hamadan Province, Iran. At the 2006 census, its population was 79, in 20 families.

References 

Populated places in Asadabad County